Marko Kump (born 9 September 1988) is a Slovenian former professional cyclist, who rode professionally between 2007 and 2020 for the , ,  and  teams, as well as four separate spells with the  team. He now works a directeur sportif for the  team, a UCI Continental team.

Career
Kump left  at the end of 2012, and joined  for the 2013 campaign.

Major results

2005
 2nd Road race, National Junior Road Championships
2006
 6th Road race, UCI Junior World Championships
2007
 1st Poreč Trophy
2008
 3rd Poreč Trophy
2009
 1st Stage 4 Tour of Slovenia
 1st Stage 3 Tour de l'Avenir
 2nd  Road race, Mediterranean Games
 2nd Prague–Karlovy Vary–Prague
 4th Overall Coupe des nations Ville Saguenay
1st Stage 1
 4th Trofeo Zsšdi
 5th Gran Premio della Costa Etruschi
 6th Road race, UCI Under-23 Road World Championships
 6th GP Kranj
 6th ZLM Tour
 9th Overall Istrian Spring Trophy
1st Stage 1
2010
 1st Trofeo Zsšdi
 1st Ronde van Vlaanderen Beloften
 1st Stage 4 Settimana Internazionale di Coppi e Bartali
 2nd Road race, National Under-23 Road Championships
 3rd Zagreb–Ljubljana
 9th Giro del Friuli
2012
 1st Banja Luka–Beograd I
 1st Grand Prix Südkärnten
 1st Central European Tour Budapest GP
 1st Ljubljana–Zagreb
 1st Stage 1 Szlakiem Grodów Piastowskich
 2nd Road race, National Road Championships
 2nd Banja Luka–Beograd II
 2nd Trofeo Matteotti
 3rd Overall Istrian Spring Trophy
1st Stage 1
 4th Trofeo Zsšdi
 5th Overall Course de Solidarność et des Champions Olympiques
 6th ProRace Berlin
 8th Giro di Toscana
2013
 9th Overall World Ports Classic
2015
 1st  Overall Tour of Małopolska
1st Stages 1 & 2
 1st Trofej Umag
 1st Poreč Trophy
 1st GP Adria Mobil
 1st Banja Luka–Beograd I
 1st Croatia–Slovenia
 1st Velothon Stockholm
 Tour of Qinghai Lake
1st  Points classification
1st Stages 1, 2, 6, 9 & 12
 Tour d'Azerbaïdjan
1st  Points classification
1st Stage 1
 1st Stage 2 Tour of Croatia
 1st Stage 3 Istrian Spring Trophy
 1st Stage 4 Tour of Slovenia
 4th GP Laguna
 4th GP Izola
 7th Gran Premio Industria e Commercio di Prato
 9th Banja Luka–Beograd II
2016
 Tour of Qinghai Lake
1st Stages 9 & 10
2017
 2nd GP Izola
 2nd Brussels Cycling Classic
 8th EuroEyes Cyclassics
2018
 6th Clásica de Almería
2019
 1st GP Slovenian Istria
 1st GP Adria Mobil
 1st GP Kranj
 1st Croatia–Slovenia
 Tour of Bihor
1st  Points classification
1st Stage 1
 1st Stage 4 Belgrade–Banja Luka
 1st Stage 1 CRO Race
 3rd Road race, National Road Championships
 5th Trofej Umag
2020
 2nd Trofej Umag
 4th GP Kranj

References

External links

1988 births
Living people
Slovenian male cyclists
Sportspeople from Novo Mesto
Mediterranean Games silver medalists for Slovenia
Mediterranean Games medalists in cycling
Competitors at the 2009 Mediterranean Games